The 2015 Illapel earthquake occurred  offshore from Illapel (Coquimbo region, Chile) on September 16 at 19:54:32 Chile Standard Time (22:54:32 UTC), with a moment magnitude of 8.3–8.4. The initial quake lasted between three and five minutes; it was followed by several aftershocks greater than magnitude six and two that exceeded 7.0 moment magnitude. The Chilean government reported 15 deaths, 6 missing and thousands of people affected. In Buenos Aires, Argentina, a man died from a stroke while he was evacuating a building.

Earthquake

The earthquake occurred on thrust faults along the boundary of the Nazca and South American plates. The region frequently produces large earthquakes, and 15 others of magnitude 7 or higher have taken place within 400 km of the epicenter over the past 100 years. The last big quake that occurred in this region was the 1943 Ovalle earthquake, reaching a magnitude in the range 7.9–8.2; however, comparisons of the associated source time function (the time history of release of seismic moment) show that the 2015 event was significantly larger than the 1943 earthquake, in terms of duration, up-dip rupture extent and tsunami size.

This earthquake had an unusual foreshock, just 20 seconds before the main 8.3 earthquake, reaching a magnitude of 7.2. This has been considered as one of the most complex earthquakes to be ever studied in Chile.

Damage and range

Illapel, an inland city of 30,000 residents, was reported immediately to be without electricity or drinking water. Many towns and small cities in the Coquimbo region saw a lot of damage, where the earthquake was felt with an intensity of VIII Mercalli. The panic took over the great cities like  La Serena , Valparaiso and the capital Santiago. Two days after the quake, about 90,000 people were still without electricity. On September 21, officials were reporting over 9,000 people had been left homeless by the quake.

The Argentine provinces of Mendoza, San Juan, Córdoba, Tucumán, La Rioja, San Luis and Santa Fe were also affected.

Tsunami

Tsunami watches, warnings, and advisories were issued in Ecuador, Peru, New Zealand, Fiji, Solomon Islands, Hawaii, California and Japan. The first tsunami waves arrived on the Chilean coast within minutes. The port of Coquimbo, along with the Costanera, was heavily damaged. The tsunami also damaged the iconic La Serena monumental lighthouse.

In the coastal city of Tongoy, large areas along the sea front were destroyed, along with the Tongoy beach itself, which was heavily affected by both earthquake and tsunami. Across the region at least 500 buildings were destroyed, while dozens of beachfront homes in Los Vilos were damaged or destroyed.  A state of emergency was declared in Coquimbo a day after the tsunami, with troops to be deployed to the area.

Evacuations

Chilean authorities ordered the immediate evacuation of the coast due to tsunami risk, with many people in coastal areas receiving automatic notices by cellphone shortly after the quake. The undersecretary for the ministry of the interior and public security reported that the evacuation affected one million people across the country.

Although causing significant damage, the Illapel earthquake's low death toll relative to the 525 casualties of the significantly more powerful 2010 Chile earthquake was credited, in part, to its occurrence in a less-populated region, better coastal preparedness and an improved tsunami warning system, the longstanding enforcement of seismic building codes, and an improved emergency response.

See also
2010 Chile earthquake
List of earthquakes in 2015
List of earthquakes in Chile

References

Further reading

External links
 
 

Illapel
Illapel
Illapel earthquake
Illapel 2015
Illapel 2015
Illapel earthquake
History of Coquimbo Region